April Wine is the eponymous debut studio album by Canadian rock band April Wine, released in September 1971. The album spawned the band's debut single "Fast Train" which received fairly steady airplay.

Track listing

Personnel

April Wine 
Jim Henman - bass, acoustic guitar (lead vocals on "Can't Find the Town", "Song for Mary", "Wench", "Time")
 Ritchie Henman - percussion, keyboards
 David Henman - vocals, guitar, sitar (lead vocals on "Oceana", "Page Five")
 Myles Goodwyn - vocals, guitar (lead vocals on "Fast Train", "Listen Mister")

References 

April Wine albums
1971 debut albums
Aquarius Records (Canada) albums
Big Tree Records albums